In mathematics, forcing is a method of constructing new models M[G] of set theory by adding a generic subset G of a poset P to a model M. The poset P used will determine what statements hold in the new universe (the 'extension'); to force a statement of interest thus requires construction of a suitable P. This article lists some of the posets P that have been used in this construction.

Notation
P is a poset with order <
V is the universe of all sets
M is a countable transitive model of set theory
G is a generic subset of P over M.

Definitions
P satisfies the countable chain condition if every antichain in P is at most countable. This implies that V and V[G] have the same cardinals (and the same cofinalities).
A subset G of P is called generic over M if it is a filter that meets every dense subset of P in M.

Amoeba forcing

Amoeba forcing is forcing with the amoeba order, and adds a measure 1 set of random reals.

Cohen forcing

In Cohen forcing (named after Paul Cohen) P is the set of functions from a finite subset of ω2 × ω to {0,1}
and  if .

This poset satisfies the countable chain condition. Forcing with this poset adds ω2 distinct reals to the model; this was the poset used by Cohen in his original proof of the independence of the continuum hypothesis.

More generally, one can replace ω2 by any cardinal κ so construct a model where the continuum has size at least κ. Here, there is no restriction. If κ has cofinality ω, the reals end up bigger than κ.

Grigorieff forcing

Grigorieff forcing (after Serge Grigorieff) destroys a free ultrafilter on ω.

Hechler forcing
Hechler forcing (after Stephen Herman Hechler) is used to show that Martin's axiom implies that every family of less than c functions from ω to ω is eventually dominated by some such function.

P is the set of pairs  where s is a finite sequence of natural numbers (considered as functions from a finite ordinal to ω) and E is a finite subset of some fixed set G of functions from ω to ω. The element (s, E) is stronger than  if t is contained in s, F is contained in E, and if k is in the domain of s but not of t then  for all h in F.

Jockusch–Soare forcing
Forcing with  classes was invented by Robert Soare and Carl Jockusch to prove, among other results, the low basis theorem.

Iterated forcing

Iterated forcing with finite supports was introduced by Solovay and Tennenbaum to show the consistency of Suslin's hypothesis. Easton introduced another type of iterated forcing to determine the possible values of the continuum function at regular cardinals.  Iterated forcing with countable support was investigated by Laver in his proof of the consistency of Borel's conjecture, Baumgartner, who introduced Axiom A forcing, and Shelah, who introduced proper forcing.  Revised countable support iteration was introduced by Shelah to handle semi-proper forcings, such as Prikry forcing, and generalizations, notably including Namba forcing.

Laver forcing 
Laver forcing was used by Laver to show that Borel's conjecture, which says that all strong measure zero sets are countable, is consistent with ZFC. (Borel's conjecture is not consistent with the continuum hypothesis.)

P is the set of Laver trees, ordered by inclusion.

A Laver tree p is a subset of the finite sequences of natural numbers such that
 p is a tree: p contains any initial sequence of any element of p, equivalently stated as p is closed under initial segments

Laver forcing satisfies the Laver property.

Levy collapsing

These posets will collapse various cardinals, in other words force them to be equal in size to smaller cardinals.

Collapsing a cardinal to ω: P is the set of all finite sequences of ordinals less than a given cardinal λ. If λ is uncountable then forcing with this poset collapses λ to ω.
Collapsing a cardinal to another: P is the set of all functions from a subset of κ of cardinality less than κ to λ (for fixed cardinals κ and λ). Forcing with this poset collapses λ down to κ.
This poset collapses all cardinals less than λ onto κ, but keeps λ as the successor to κ.

Levy collapsing is named for Azriel Levy.

Magidor forcing
Amongst many forcing notions developed by Magidor, one of the best known is a generalization of Prikry forcing used to change the cofinality of a cardinal to a given smaller regular cardinal.

Mathias forcing
An element of P is a pair consisting of a finite set s of natural numbers and an infinite set A of natural numbers such that every element of s is less than every element of A. The order is defined by 

Mathias forcing is named for Adrian Mathias.

Namba forcing 
Namba forcing (after Kanji Namba) is used to change the cofinality of ω2 to ω without collapsing ω1.
P is the set of all trees  (nonempty downward closed subsets of the set of finite sequences of ordinals less than ω2) which have the property that any s in T has an extension in T which has   immediate successors. P is ordered by inclusion (i.e., subtrees are stronger conditions). The intersection of all trees in the generic filter defines a countable sequence which is cofinal in ω2.

Namba' forcing is the subset of P such that there is a node below which the ordering is linear and above which each node has  immediate successors.

Magidor and Shelah proved that if CH holds then a generic object of Namba forcing does not exist in the generic extension by Namba', and vice versa.

Prikry forcing 
In Prikry forcing (after Karel Prikrý) P is the set of pairs  where s is a finite subset of a fixed measurable cardinal κ, and A is an element of a fixed normal measure D on κ. This forcing notion can be used to change to cofinality of κ while preserving all cardinals.

Product forcing 
Taking a product of forcing conditions is a way of simultaneously forcing all the conditions.
The order is given by  if  for all i.

Radin forcing
Radin forcing (after Lon Berk Radin), a technically involved generalization of Magidor forcing, adds a closed, unbounded subset to some regular cardinal λ.

If λ is a sufficiently large cardinal, then the forcing keeps λ regular, measurable, supercompact, etc.

Random forcing

P is the set of Borel subsets of [0,1] of positive measure, where p is called stronger than q if it is contained in q.

Sacks forcing
P is the set of all perfect trees contained in the set of finite  sequences. (A tree T is a set of finite sequences containing all initial segments of its members, and is called perfect if for any element t of T there is a segment s extending t so that both s0 and s1 are in T.) A tree p is stronger than q if p is contained in q. Forcing with perfect trees was used by Gerald Enoch Sacks to produce a real a with minimal degree of constructibility.

Sacks forcing has the Sacks property.

Shooting a fast club
In , we have that  is a closed unbounded subset of S almost contained in each club set in V.  is preserved. This method was introduced by Ronald Jensen in order to show the consistency of the continuum hypothesis and the Suslin hypothesis.

Shooting a club with countable conditions

Shooting a club with finite conditions
P is ordered by reverse inclusion. In , we have that  is a closed unbounded subset of S and all cardinals are preserved.

Silver forcing

Silver forcing (after Jack Howard Silver) is the set of all those partial functions from the natural numbers into  whose domain is coinfinite; or equivalently the set of all pairs , where A is a subset of the natural numbers with infinite complement, and p is a function from A into a fixed 2-element set.  A condition q is stronger than a condition p if q extends p. 

Silver forcing satisfies Fusion, the Sacks property, and is minimal with respect to reals (but not minimal).

Vopěnka forcing

Each condition  can be represented by a tuple 
where , for all .
is isomorphic to a poset  (the conditions being the minimal representations
of elements of ).
Defining  as the set of all representations for elements  such that

References

External links
A.Miller (2009), Forcing Tidbits.

Forcing (mathematics)